Amblytelus striatus is a species of ground beetle in the subfamily Psydrinae. It was described by Sloane in 1920.

References

Amblytelus
Beetles described in 1920
Arthropods of Tasmania